Willie Over (20 January 1862 – 10 November 1910) was an Australian cricketer. He played four first-class cricket matches for Victoria between 1887 and 1890.

See also
 List of Victoria first-class cricketers

References

External links
 

1862 births
1910 deaths
Australian cricketers
Victoria cricketers
Cricketers from Melbourne